Kytki-Yelga (Qıtqıyılğa) is a rural locality (a village) in Nizhnebaltachevsky Selsoviet, Tatyshlinsky District, Bashkortostan, Russia. The population was 117 as of 2010. There are 2 streets.

Geography 
Kytki-Yelga is located 32 km east of Verkhniye Tatyshly (the district's administrative centre) by road. Tanypovka is the nearest rural locality.

References 

Rural localities in Tatyshlinsky District